Strange Ways is an independent record label from Hamburg, Germany.

Strange Ways or Strangeways or similar may also refer to:

Places
Strangeways or HM Prison Manchester
Strangeways (area), an area of inner north Manchester (England), around the prison

Arts and entertainment

Music
Strangeways, Here We Come, a 1987 album by The Smiths
"Strange Ways", a 1974 song by Kiss from Hotter Than Hell
"Strangeways", a 1987 song by Deep Purple from The House of Blue Light
"Strange Ways", a 1995 song by Ace of Base from The Bridge
"Strange Ways", a 2004 song by Madvillain from Madvillainy

Film
Strangeways, Here We Come, a 2017 British comedy drama film shot in Salford, Greater Manchester

Graphic novel
Strangeways, a 2008 graphic novel

Other
Strangeways (surname), a surname

See also
 Catherine Strangeways (disambiguation)
Strangways, a surname